The Hålogaland Fotballkrets (Hålogaland Football Association) is one of the 18 district organisations of the Norwegian Football Federation. It administers lower tier football in the traditional district of Sør-Troms, Ofoten, Lofoten and most of Vesterålen.

Background 
Hålogaland Fotballkrets, is the governing body for football in the traditional district of Hålogaland, which covers parts of counties Nordland and Troms og Finnmark. The Association currently has 61 member clubs. Based in Harstad, the Association's chairman is Frank Johnsen.

Affiliated Members 
The following 61 clubs are affiliated to the Hålogaland Fotballkrets:

Ajaks SFK
Alsvåg IL
Andenes IL
IL Andøygutten
Ballangen FK
Ballstad UIL
Beisfjord IL
Bjerkvik IF
IL Blest
FK Brage Trondenes
Fjelldal IL
Flakstad IL
FK Landsås
Gratangen IL
UIL Gravdal
Grovfjord IL
Grytøy IL
Håkvik IL
SK Hardhaus
Harstad Damefotball
Harstad IL
Henningsvær IL
Hinnøya Futsal (futsal)
Høken SK
IL Holmgang
Ibestad IL
IF KIL-Kameratene
Kabelvåg IL
IL King
Kjøpsnes IL
Knausen FK
Kvæfjord IL
Laukvik IL
Laupstad IL
Leknes FK
Liland IF
Lødingen IL
FK Lofoten
Lokomotiv Lofoten FK (futsal)
FK Luna
Medkila IL
Melbo IL
FK Mjølner
IL Morild
Narvik/Fagernes IL
Nord/Sprint IL
Reine IL
Sandtorg UIL
IL Santor
Sjøbrott U&IL
Skånland OIF
Skjomen IL
Sortland IL
Sørvikmark IL
Stålbrott IL
Stamsund IL
Stokmarknes IL
Strauman IL
Svolvær IL
FK Varg
Vesterålen Futsal (futsal)

League competitions 
Hålogaland Fotballkrets run the following league competitions:

Men's football
4. divisjon  -  one section
5. divisjon  -  four sections

Women's football
2. divisjon  -  one section

Footnotes

External links 

Hålogaland
Sport in Nordland
Sport in Troms